Imaginary Enemy is the sixth studio album by American rock band the Used. It is the first album released on, and the second label the band created and own, GAS Union.

Imaginary Enemy is the final album to feature guitarist Quinn Allman before he parted from the band in November 2015.

Recording 
The album was produced by John Feldmann, who also produced all of the band's studio albums with the exception of Artwork.

In an interview with Jeph, he stated that they recorded the album "backwards" by having the vocals recorded first and then having the music written to the vocals. It is the first time they have recorded like this and did so because they were unhappy with the sound of the songs when recording the music so they scrapped the dozen songs they had written and tried something new.

Release
On January 20, 2014, Imaginary Enemy was announced for release in April; its track listing and artwork were revealed. A week later, a music video was released for "Cry". The track was released to alternative radio stations on February 4. Following a performance at South by So What?! festival, the band went on a co-headlining US tour with Taking Back Sunday in March and April. They were supported by Sleepwave and Tonight Alive. Imaginary Enemy was made available for streaming on March 26, before being released on April 1 through Hopeless Records and the band's label GAS Union. The band performed at the Download Festival in the UK in June. The group toured Australia with Taking Back Sunday in August and the US in September and October with support from Frank Iero.

Partway through the tour, the group released a split 10" vinyl EP, which featured two songs by Taking Back Sunday, and "Revolution" and "Money Monster" from the Used. On September 18, a music video was released for "Revolution". The track was released to alternative radio stations on September 30. On February 2, 2015, the band announced that guitarist Quinn Allman would be taking a temporary year of absence; Justin Shekoski of Saosin filled in Allman's role. Following this, the group went on a headlining UK tour with support from Decade and Landscapes. In April and May, the group went on a headlining US tour with support from Every Time I Die, Marmozets and the Eeries, before embarking on a co-headlining US tour with Chevelle later in May. In October, the band appeared at the Taste of Chaos festival.

Reception

At Alternative Press, Evan Lucy rated the album three-and-a-half stars out of five, writing that "Whether the band's fanbase latches on to the politicism is yet to be seen, but these songs will sound great from the pit regardless."

The album charted at number 14 on the Billboard 200 and number 1 on the Independent albums chart.

Track listing

Additional track information
The Used released 12 tracks from the Imaginary Enemy recording session.  The only b-side released to date is "Money Monster" which was released as a bonus track on the limited edition of the album.  A hidden track titled "Red Heart" also appears at the end of the album.

Limited edition 
A limited edition of 15,000 numbered copies will be made featuring deluxe artwork and a bonus track titled "Money Monster".

Personnel 

The Used
 Bert McCracken – lead vocals
 Quinn Allman – guitar
 Jeph Howard – bass
 Dan Whitesides – drums

Technical and production
 John Feldmann – producer, mixing
 Zakk Cervini – programming, additional mixing, engineering
 Ago Teppand – programming, additional mixing, engineering
 Kenny Carkeet – programming, additional mixing, engineering
 Chris Qualls – additional engineering
 James Clarke – additional engineering

Chart performance

Live debut of the songs

Release history

References

External links

Imaginary Enemy at YouTube (streamed copy where licensed)

2014 albums
Albums produced by John Feldmann
The Used albums
Hopeless Records albums